The Michael A. Bilandic Building, (formally the Justice Michael Bilandic State of Illinois Building and formerly State of Illinois Building) is a building located at 160 North LaSalle Street in the Loop community area of Chicago, Illinois. The 21-story building was constructed in 1920. Following the 1985 completion of the James R. Thompson Center, which currently serves as the primary building for the State of Illinois, this building became the State of Illinois Annex Building. The 92nd General Assembly of the State of Illinois passed a resolution to rename the State of Illinois Building the Justice Michael Bilandic State of Illinois Building. The legislation was adopted on February 5, 2003. The building was named after Michael Anthony Bilandic, a former mayor of Chicago, a chief justice of the Supreme Court of Illinois and a United States Marine Corps first lieutenant, shortly after his death.

References

External links
 Emporis.com page

Skyscraper office buildings in Chicago
Government buildings completed in 1920
Office buildings completed in 1920
State government buildings in the United States
Government buildings in Chicago
Chicago school architecture in Illinois
1920 establishments in Illinois